Kyriacos Kyriacou (born 20 June 1989 in Larnaca),  is a Cypriot professional footballer who plays for Ermis Aradippou in the Cypriot Second Division.

Career 
He began his career at AEK Larnaca, progressed through the youth academies, and in 2006 was promoted to the first team.

References

External links
Profile at UEFA.com

1989 births
Living people
Cypriot footballers
Association football defenders
Greek Cypriot people
People from Larnaca
AEK Larnaca FC players
Nea Salamis Famagusta FC players
APOP Kinyras FC players
Omonia Aradippou players
Anagennisi Deryneia FC players
Othellos Athienou F.C. players
Ermis Aradippou FC players
Cyprus under-21 international footballers
Cypriot First Division players
Cypriot Second Division players